The Laksamana is a position within the armed forces, similar to the position of admiral in Malay sultanates and in present-day countries like Indonesia and Malaysia. Since South East Asia was part of Indosphere of Greater India since earlier, during and after the Hinduised Srivijaya empire, Hindu titles based on Sanskrit were used. The word Laksamana originated from Lakshmana, a figure in the Hindu epic of Ramayana.

Malacca Sultanate
The Laksamana in the Malacca Sultanate was in charge for the sea security of the Sultanate, and most importantly, the China-India trade route within the Straits of Malacca. That trade route was the lifeline of the Empire. He was in full command of the Malaccan fleet, outranked only by the Bendahara and the Sultan.

Malacca's most famous Laksamana is Hang Tuah.

Modern-day usage

Navy and coast guard
In modern times, the word refers to a rank in Brunei (by the Royal Brunei Navy), in Indonesia (by the Indonesian Navy and Indonesian Maritime Security Agency) and in Malaysia (by the Royal Malaysian Navy and Malaysian Maritime Enforcement Agency).

The common grades for "Laksamana" title are:
  (a five-star rank used by Royal Malaysian Navy)
  (a five-star rank used by Indonesian Navy)
  (a four-star rank)
  ("Vice Admiral", a three-star rank)
  ("Rear Admiral", a two-star rank)
  (a one-star rank, Rear Admiral or Commodore)

Surname
Laksamana, along with its Hispanicized forms Lacsamana and Laxamana, is a family name among the Pampangan people of the Philippines and their descendants.

See also 

 Bendahara
 Penghulu Bendahari
 Syahbandar
 Temenggung

Reference 

History of Pampanga
Indonesian Navy
Military history of Malaysia
Malay culture
ms:Laksamana